Wendell K. Willard (born September 12, 1940) is an American politician. He was a member of the Georgia House of Representatives from the 51st District, serving since 2001. He is a member of the Republican party. An attorney, Willard practices law in metro Atlanta area. He served as appointed County Attorney for DeKalb county from 1973 to 1977 and as City Attorney for the City of Sandy Springs from December 2005 to July 2017, when he retired.

References

Living people
Republican Party members of the Georgia House of Representatives
1940 births
People from Decatur, Georgia
21st-century American politicians